Rebecca Marino was the defending champion but chose not to participate.

Ashlyn Krueger won the title, defeating Sachia Vickery in the final, 6–3, 7–5.

Seeds

Draw

Finals

Top half

Bottom half

References

External Links
Main Draw

The Women's Hospital Classic - Singles